{{Infobox company
| name = Jewish National Fund
| logo = File:Flag of Jewish National Fund.svg
| logo_size = 180px
| logo_alt = 
| logo_caption = 
| logo_padding = 
| image = File:Jewish National Fund office.JPG
| image_size = 200px
| image_alt = 
| image_caption = JNF Headquarters in Jerusalem
| trading_name = 
| native_name = Acronym: 
| native_name_lang = he
| romanized_name = 
| former_name = 
| type = Public-benefit corporation
| traded_as = 
| ISIN = 
| industry = Real estate
| founded = 
| founder = 
| hq_location = 
| hq_location_city = Jerusalem
| hq_location_country = 
| num_locations = 
| num_locations_year = 
| area_served = 
| key_people = Avraham Duvdevani, chairperson, Russel Robinson, JNF-USA CEO
| production_year = 
| services = 
| revenue = ₪ 2.583 billion
| revenue_year = 2015<ref name=report>{{Cite web|url=https://www.kkl.org.il/about-us/organizational-transparency/organization-budget-balance/financial-report-2015/|title=דוח כספי לשנת 2015|language=he|trans-title=Financial report for 2015|website=Jewish National Fund}}</ref>
| operating_income = ₪ 511 million
| income_year = 2015
| net_income = ₪ 398 million
| net_income_year = 2015
| assets = ₪ 12.720 billion
| assets_year = 2015
| equity = 
| equity_year = 
| num_employees = 950
| num_employees_year = 2015
| website =  jnf.org
| footnotes = 
| intl = 
}}

Jewish National Fund (Keren Kayemet LeYisrael, previously , Ha Fund HaLeumi) is a non-profit organizationRebecca Spence."Reform Slams Knesset Plan for JNF Land"; Jewish Daily Forward, July 25, 2007 founded in 1901 to buy and develop land in Ottoman Syria (later Mandatory Palestine, subsequently Israel and the Palestinian territories) for Jewish settlement. By 2007, it owned 13% of the total land in Israel. Since its inception, the JNF says it has planted over 240 million trees in Israel. It has also built 180 dams and reservoirs, developed  of land and established more than 1,000 parks.

In 2002, the JNF was awarded the Israel Prize for lifetime achievement and special contribution to society and the State of Israel.

Name
The name Keren Kayemet comes from the Mishnah. Tractate Peah (1:1) lists the types of good deeds whose rewards are enjoyed in this world, while the principal merit will be in the world to come: .

History

The idea of a national land purchasing fund was first presented at the First Zionist Congress in 1897 by Hermann Schapira, a German-Jewish professor of mathematics. The fund, named Keren Hakayemet (later known in English as the "Jewish National Fund") was formally established at the Fifth Zionist Congress in Basel in 1901. In its early years, the organization was headed by the Jewish industrialist Johann Kremenezky. Early land purchases were completed in Judea and the Lower Galilee. In 1909, the JNF played a central role in the founding of Tel Aviv. The establishment of the “Olive Tree Fund” marked the beginning of Diaspora support of afforestation efforts. The JNF collection boxes or Blue Box (known in Yiddish as a pushke) has been part of the JNF since its inception, symbolizing the partnership between Israel and the Diaspora. In the period between the two world wars, about one million of these blue and white tin collection boxes could be found in Jewish homes throughout the world. From 1902 until the late 1940s, the JNF sold JNF stamps to raise money. For a brief period in May 1948, JNF stamps were used as postage stamps during the transition from Palestine to Israel.

Ottoman era
It became an olive grove. In 1904 and 1905, the JNF purchased land plots near the Sea of Galilee and at Ben Shemen. In 1921, JNF land holdings reached 25,000 acres (100 km²), rising to 50,000 acres (200 km²) by 1927. At the end of 1935, JNF held 89,500 acres (362 km²) of land housing 108 Jewish communities.

British Mandate

In 1939, 10% of the Jewish population of the British Mandate of Palestine lived on JNF land. JNF holdings by the end of the British Mandate period amounted to 936 km². By 1948, the JNF owned 54% of the land held by Jews in the region, or a bit less than 4% of the land in what was then known as the British Mandate of Palestine. Most of the JNF's activities during the Mandatory period were closely associated with Yossef Weitz, the head of its settlement department.

From the beginning, JNF's policy was to lease land long-term rather than sell it. In its charter, the JNF states: "Since the first land purchase in Eretz Israel in the early 1900s for and on behalf of the Jewish People, JNF has served as the Jewish People's trustee of the land, initiating and charting development work to enable Jewish settlement from the border in the north to the edge of the desert and Arava in the south."

State of Israel

After Israel's establishment in 1948, the government began to sell absentee lands to the JNF. On January 27, 1949, 1,000 km² of land (from a total of about 3,500 km²) was sold to the JNF for the price of IL11 million. Another 1,000 km² of land was sold to the JNF in October 1950. Over the years questions about the legitimacy of these transactions have been raised but Israeli legislation has generally supported the JNF's land claims.

In 1953, the JNF was dissolved and re-organized as an Israeli company under the name Keren Kayemet LeYisrael (JNF-KKL). In 1960, administration of the land held by the JNF-KKL, apart from forested areas, was transferred to a newly formed government agency, the Israel Land Administration (ILA). The ILA was then responsible for managing some 93% of the land of Israel. All the land managed by the ILA was defined as Israel lands; it included both land owned by the government (about 80%) and land owned by the JNF-KKL (about 13%). The JNF-KKL received the right to nominate 10 of the 22 directors of the ILA, lending it significant leverage within that state body.

After concentrating on the centre and northern part of the young state, the JNF-KKL started supporting Jewish settlements around the Negev border from around 1965. After the Six-Day War in 1967, the JNF-KKL started work in the newly occupied Palestinian territories as well.

Reclamation projects
The JNF charter specifies the reclamation of land for the Jewish people as its primary purpose. During the 1980s, almost  were planted. Over  of crop-land were reclaimed, and hundreds of miles of roads built. Research into the soil and water conservation and the construction of dams and reservoirs took on added importance in the face of water shortages and drought.

The JNF's collaborative work involves participation in the International Arid Land Consortium, which explores the problems and solutions unique to arid and semiarid regions, working to develop sustainable ecological practices to improve the quality of life among people in the dry areas.

Afforestation

The early JNF was active in afforestation and reclamation of land. By 1935, JNF had planted 1.7 million trees over a total area of 1,750 acres (7.08 km²) and drained swamps, like those in the Hula Valley. Over fifty years, the JNF planted over 260 million trees largely in semi-arid, rocky, hilly terrain in which cultivation is not cost-effective and the risk of land degradation is high. While the Ministry of Agriculture is the official regulator of Israel's forests, the JNF is responsible for the implementation of forest management and afforestation.
The JNF has been criticized for planting non-native pine trees which are unsuited to the climate, rather than local species such as olive trees. Others say that JNF deserves credit for this decision, and the forests would not have survived otherwise. According to JNF statistics, six out of every 10 saplings planted at a JNF site in Jerusalem do not survive, although the survival rate for planting sites outside Jerusalem is much higher – close to 95 percent. The Israeli newspaper Maariv wrote that workers remove saplings daily to allow more tourists to plant the following day, but the JNF denied this and said it would sue the paper for libel. The Union for Environmental Defense has criticized the fund's forestry practices for "overreliance on highly flammable pine trees" and overuse of toxic herbicides, in the context of minimal government and public scrutiny. Some forests have been planted for security reasons and as a means of demarcating Israeli space. Critics argue that many JNF lands outside the West Bank were illegally confiscated from Palestinian refugees, and that the JNF furthermore should not be involved with lands in the West Bank. Shaul Ephraim Cohen has said trees have been planted to restrict Bedouin herding. Susan Nathan wrote that forests were planted on the site of abandoned Arab villages after the 1948 war. Nathan also writes that olive trees were replaced by pine and cypress trees and that JNF afforestation policy erases traces of the Arab presence prior to 1948. In 2008, the JNF announced that historical information plaques erected in JNF parks and forests would cite the names of the Arab villages formerly located there.

The JNF provided the Palestinian Authority with 3,000 tree seedlings for a forested area being developed on the edge of the new city.

Water conservation
Israel's fresh water supply is dependent on 50 days a year of seasonal rainfall, while water consumption has doubled since 1960. Towards the end of the 1980s, the JNF undertook several large-scale water conservation projects. Dams and reservoirs were built to capture rainwater run-off which would have otherwise been lost in the Arava Valley, Reshafim in the Beit She'arim Valley and Kedma near Kiryat Gat.  An artificial lake was built in Timna Park.

The JNF has built 200 reservoirs around the country, and plans to build 30 more reservoirs and water treatment plants over the next five years. JNF is also involved in river rehabilitation projects all over Israel, such as the Nahal Alexander Restoration Project begun in 2003.

Land development

The JNF's engagement in developing Israel for Jewish purposes has involved a range of massive land infrastructure development projects. In the 1980s, the JNF launched a project known collectively as "Operation Promised Land", to meet the challenge of the massive upsurge of Jewish immigration from the Soviet Union and Ethiopia. In recent years, the JNF has again moved towards the development of towns to accommodate new Jewish immigrants, focusing on the Galilee and Negev regions, the two areas of Israel with a tenuous Jewish demographic majority. In particular, the JNF's 600 million dollar Blueprint Negev aims to attract and build infrastructure for 250,000 new settlers in the Negev desert, which accounts for 60% of the country's land mass but remains sparsely populated. The plan has come under scrutiny as groups such as Bustan, Save the Negev, and Ohalah have expressed concern over the project's lack of transparency in light of the potential strain on ecological resources and the possible impacts on Bedouin communities nearby.Rebecca Manski.A Desert Mirage: The Rising Role of US Money in Negev Development;News from Within October/November 2006

International fundraising arms
United States

The United States arm of the JNF, incorporated on January 26, 1926, is the largest contributor to JNF-KKL. In 1996, JNF-USA was accused of mismanaging funds. According to the charges, only 21% of US donations reached Israel, and money was being diverted to Latin American JNF offices. In the wake of this scandal, the North American management was forced to resign. The tax-exempt status of the JNF-USA was challenged in 2011 as violating the public policy of the United States with respect to ethnic and religious discrimination. In July 2017, in response to an investigation by the Jewish Daily Forward, the New York State attorney general's office ordered JNF-USA to rescind two illegal loans totaling more than $500,000 the organization had made to its chief executive officer, Russell Robinson, and its chief financial officer, Mitchel Rosenzweig. (New York State forbids charities from lending their officers any money.) JNF-USA argued that Robinson and Rosenzweig were not officers under the meaning of the law, but the attorney general's officer rejected that argument and the two executives agreed to repay the balance of their loans.

United Kingdom
In the United Kingdom, the JNF-UK (full name JNF Charitable Trust) was formed in 1939 and registered as a charitable organization. In October 2005, the JNF-KKL in Israel split from its British partner, accusing JNF-UK of having "misled" the public. The JNF-KKL claimed that the British group was using the KKL name to raise funds "for their own causes which are not associated with KKL." The Israeli JNF-KKL said it would launch a separate fundraising operation in the UK. JNF-UK launched a legal action to stop KKL using the names "JNF" or "Jewish National Fund" in the UK. The two organisations made peace after the Israeli-born businessman Samuel Hayek took over as JNF-UK chairman in 2008. Israeli JNF-KKL ended its dispute with the JNF-UK within weeks of ending a similar dispute with the American JNF-USA On 1 May 2020 a ruling was issued to JNF on a will writing service encouraging elderly to leave money to KKL. District Judge Geddes noted on KKL's "lack of independence from JNF UK"

The charitable status of the JNF-UK has come under increasing attack. British prime ministers Tony Blair and Gordon Brown had been Honorary Patrons of the JNF-UK, like all British prime ministers before them since its inception.  David Cameron resigned as Honorary Patron to JNF-UK in 2011. According to a spokesman, Cameron said it was an organisation that was specifically focused around work in one specific country—i.e., Israel. Cameron's decision was interpreted as a snub, in spite of the spokesman's assurances that his decision had "absolutely nothing to do with any anti-Israel campaign". However, campaigners claimed that Cameron's resignation was due to political pressure. Since then, the JNF-UK's Honorary Patrons include no leader of the main British political parties. An Early Day Motion in the British parliament called for the revocation of the JNF's charitable status in the UK and was signed by 66 Members of Parliament. In 2012 the Green Party called for the JNF to be stripped of its charity status.

2021  Controversy
On 2 December 2021, JNF-UK Chairman Samuel Hayek gave an interview to The Jerusalem Post where he expressed concern over rising levels of antisemitism in the UK, claiming that “in 10 years, maybe less, who knows, Jews will not be able to live in the UK.” When asked by Jewish News 18 days later to clarify his reasoning, Hayek claimed the evidence lied in “the number of immigrants to England. The demographic of British society is changing.” When asked to clarify if the immigrants he was referring to were Muslims, Hayek confirmed this, and went on to claim that Muslim immigrants “don’t speak English [and] create their own ghettos, their own education, their own process of thinking.”  Hayek appeared to echo sentiments closely associated with far-right great replacement theory when he continued, “the process is the white Christian majority is shrinking. It shrinks to a degree where there is a point it cannot protect itself anymore." Leaders of the Board of Deputies (BoD), the Jewish Leadership Council and the Community Security Trust all condemned Hayek’s comments, as did the Chief Rabbi, while Jewish MP Alex Sobel called for Hayek’s resignation as chair of JNF UK, or the isolation of the JNF UK from communal organisations while Hayek remained in his position. On 4 January 2022 a letter signed by 46 BoD Deputies called for Hayek to resign, stating they would continue to advise synagogues not to participate, support or cooperate with JNF-UK as long as he remained chair. On the 10 January 2022 another letter signed by 105 Jewish student leaders to suspend all programmes run by the JNF UK and to suspend JNF membership from the BoD. On the 13 January 2022 the Charity Commission for England and Wales opened a regulatory case on JNF UK to assess concerns.

On 23 December 2021, then BoD senior VP and JNF-UK deputy Gary Mond condemned Hayek's remarks, stated they did not represent JNF-UK and affirmed his belief that the UK "is one of the best places in the world to be Jewish", and that British Jews "have a great future in the UK.". On 12 January Jewish News published an article stating they had alerted the BoD to historic social media posts where Mond appeared to express support for Islamophobic sentiments, including "liking" two posts by Pamela Geller, an American far-right activist, currently banned from entering the UK, a post expressing his "concern" over a possible increase in the number of Muslim MPs and another suggesting that civilization was “at war" with Islam. In response, the BoD asked Mond to step down while an investigation took place. Mond resigned from the BoD the following day, claiming he had been "cancelled" and accusing the Board leadership of leaning to the political left and being unwilling to take account of different views.

Hayek refused to resign, and on 21 January wrote an op-ed in The Jewish Chronicle stating that he stood by his remark to The Jerusalem Post but he was "not against any minority or against the Muslims in the UK or Europe, but against anyone who spreads hatred that harms Jews" and that his previous remarks were "misconstrued".

On 23 January 2022, the BoD voted to censure JNF-UK over the failure of its board of trustees to condemn Hayek's remarks.

Canada
Following the Six-Day War, the Canadian arm of the JNF raised about $15 million US to fund a 1,700-acre park called "Canada Park." The park was built in 1970 on land that had been occupied until the war by three Palestinian villages, which were destroyed on the orders of Yitzhak Rabin. Starting around 2013, Independent Jewish Voices has campaigned against JNF Canada's charitable status, and in 2017 it filed a formal complaint with the Canadian government seeking the revocation of JNF's charitable status on the basis of discrimination.

JNF collection boxes

JNF's blue charity boxes were distributed by the JNF almost from its inception at the initiative of Johann Kremenezky.  Once found in many Jewish homes, the boxes became one of the most familiar symbols of Zionism.   A children's song about the boxes, written by  Dr. Yehoshua Frizman, Headmaster of the Real Gymnasium for Girls in Kovno, ran

A bank clerk named Haim Kleinman in Nadvorna, Galicia placed a blue box labeled "Keren Le'umit" in his office and urged others to do the same.  The first mass-produced boxes were distributed in 1904.  Kleinman visited Mandate Palestine in the 1930s and planned to make aliyah, but perished in the Holocaust.  Menahem Ussishkin wrote that "The coin the child contributes or collects for the redemption of the land is not important in itself; it is not the child that gives to the Keren Kayemeth, but rather the Fund that gives to the child, a foothold and lofty ideal for all the days of his life."

The boxes could take a variety of shapes and sizes.  Some were paper made to fold flat like envelopes and able to contain only a small number of coins, some early American boxes were cylindrical, some German boxes were made of tin stamped into the shape of bound books.

Israel issued postage stamps bearing the image of the blue box in 1983, 1991, and 1993 for the JNF's 90th anniversary.

Controversies
Transparency
T'ruah has expressed concerns that the JNF is not transparent about where their funds go and that the organization may be subsidizing projects in West Bank settlements. The organization's chief executive later acknowledged that JNF does fund projects within settlements. A review of their tax filing from 2014 led Rabbi Jill Jacobs of T'ruah to estimate that about $600,000 of the $27.2 million in grants by JNF-USA went to support settlements. In 2021, JNF announced that it would change its policy and subsidize Israeli settlements in the West Bank. However, the necessary vote of the board was delayed indefinitely in April after opposition from members and supporters abroad.

Israeli lawmakers have sought, unsuccessfully, to allow the State Comptroller to examine the books of the organization to determine whether the group's funds were being spent appropriately.

Leasing policy controversy

The JNF stipulates that only Jews can buy, mortgage or lease JNF land. Article 23 of the JNF lease states that the lessee must pay compensation to the JNF if this stipulation is violated.
On 13 October 2004, Adalah, an organization and legal center for Arab minority rights in Israel, submitted a petition to the Supreme Court entitled Challenging the Prohibition on Arab Citizens of Israel from Living on Jewish National Fund Land. Shortly afterwards, the Association for Civil Rights in Israel and the Arab Center for Alternative Planning also filed a petition to the Supreme Court challenging the ILA policy as discriminatory. The JNF responded to the two petitions on 9 December. In its response, the JNF stated:

On 26 January 2005, Israel's Attorney General Menachem Mazuz ruled that lease restrictions violated Israeli anti-discrimination laws, and that the ILA could not discriminate against Arab citizens of Israel in the marketing and allocation of the lands it managed; this applied both to government lands and to lands belonging to the JNF. However, the Attorney General also decided that, whenever a non-Jewish citizen wins an ILA tender for a plot of JNF-owned land, the ILA would compensate the JNF with an equal amount of land.

As a result of the Mazuz ruling, authorities found themselves facing a conundrum: on the one hand the JNF, as a "private" organization, had received donations from outside Israel which were specifically earmarked for the benefit of Jews; on the other hand, the state and the ILA (an agency of the state), which administered the land owned by the JNF, were banned from discriminating against non-Jews. In early 2005, the JNF and the Finance Ministry were reported as trying to draft a new agreement that would separate the JNF from the state, thereby allowing it to continue selling land to Jews only.

In July 2007, the Israeli Knesset approved the Jewish National Fund Bill, submitted by MK Uri Ariel (National Union/National Religious Party), in its preliminary reading; but the bill was later dropped. The bill sought to authorize the JNF practice of refusing to lease land to Arab citizens. The bill called for a new provision to the 1960 Israel Land Administration Law, entitled "Management of the Jewish National Fund's Lands"; the provision stated that regardless of other conflicting rulings, leasing JNF lands for Jewish settlement did not constitute discrimination, and: "For the purpose of every law, the association documents of the Jewish National Fund will be interpreted according to the judgment of the Jewish National Fund's founders and from a nationalist-Zionist standpoint."

In September 2007, the High Court heard a further Adalah petition seeking cancellation of an ILA policy as well as Article 27 of the Regulations of the Obligations of Tenders'', which in concert prevent Arab citizens from participating in bids for JNF-controlled land. The High Court of Justice agreed to delay a ruling by at least four months, and a temporary settlement was reached (following the compromise proposed in 2005 by Menachem Mazuz) wherein, although the JNF would be prevented from discriminating on grounds of ethnicity, nevertheless every time land is sold to a non-Jew, the ILA would compensate it with an equivalent amount of land, thus ensuring the total amount of land owned by Jewish Israelis remains the same.

An alternative proposal submitted by Amnon Rubinstein, a former minister, recommended that a distinction be made between JNF lands and state lands, such that all JNF lands directly acquired via donations from abroad specifically for the benefit of Jews (some ) will pass to the direct control of the JNF; while properties purchased by the JNF from the state in the 1950s and formerly belonging to Palestinian refugees (the so-called "lands of missing persons" or "absentee" lands, amounting to ) would revert to state control. Rubinstein's intention was "to avoid passing racist legislation [such as the Ariel Bill] that would limit the use of these lands to the Jews". Others denied however that the Ariel Bill was racist.
The Rubinstein proposal was not taken up.

In late 2007 a land swap deal was proposed that would allowing the JNF to continue leasing its lands only to Jews. Urban JNF land sold in future to non-Jews would include an automatic swap mechanism: the fund would transfer the land to the ILA, and in exchange would receive the purchase price plus a similar-sized plot in the Negev.

Legal conflicts
In December 2011, Seth Morrison resigned from the board of JNF-USA in protest at the decision by Himnuta, a subsidiary of JNF-KKL, to launch eviction proceedings against the Sumarin family, who lived in the Silwan neighborhood of East Jerusalem. In the case of the Sumarin family, the children of the original owner, Musa Sumarin, were declared absentees after his death even though there were other family members living in the home at the time. In 1991, the Israeli government took the step of transferring the property to the JNF subsidiary. A campaign against the JNF's eviction was launched by Rabbis for Human Rights, the Sheikh Jarrah Solidarity Movement, and the Jewish organization Yachad. The pressures led the JNF to delay the eviction. The JNF played a similar role in evicting the Gozlan family in the 1990s.

See also
Central Zionist Archives in Jerusalem. Collections of the Jewish National Fund (KKL1-KKL17)
Israel Land Administration
Israel Land Authority
Jewish National Fund Tree of Life Award
List of forests in Israel
List of Israel Prize recipients
Palestine Jewish Colonization Association

References

External links
 
  
 United States branch
 JNF-USA v. KKL-JNF in Israel
 Guide to the Jewish National Fund Records in the Hadassah Archives on Long-term Deposit at the American Jewish Historical Society
 The Central Zionist Archives in Jerusalem. Collections of the Jewish National Fund.
 Adalah's lawsuit against KKL-JNF
 Intelligent Giving profile of JNF Charitable Trust (UK)  - Note that JNF-CT (UK) is no longer affiliated with KKL-JNF
 Joel H. Golovensky and Ariel Gilboa, "Is This Land Still Our Land? The Expropriation of Zionism", Azure 36 (Spring 2009).
 Ameinu writes in opposition to JNF bill 2007
 Collection of Jewish National Fund posters
 Erez Israel (B70), early newsletter of the Jewish National Fund, digitized at the Leo Baeck Institute, New York 

Environmental organizations based in Israel
Israel Prize recipients that are organizations
Israel Prize for lifetime achievement & special contribution to society recipients
Organizations established in 1901
Yishuv
Zionist organizations
Land management in Israel
International Jewish organizations
Forestry in Israel
Desert greening
Reforestation